List of The Magicians episodes may refer to:
 List of The Magicians (British TV series) episodes
 List of The Magicians (American TV series) episodes